Gunter Independent School District is a public school district based in Gunter, Texas (USA).

Located in Gunter, Grayson County, the district extends into a very small portion of northern Collin County. It previously served high school students from the neighboring Tioga Independent School District (however, Tioga began adding high school grades in 2012-2013 and completed doing so in 2015-2016).

In 2009, the school district was rated "exemplary" by the Texas Education Agency.

Schools
Gunter Elementary (PK-4), 2008-2009 TEA rating: Exemplary
Gunter Middle (5-8), 2008-2009 TEA rating: Exemplary
Gunter High (9-12),  2008-2009 TEA rating: Exemplary

Competitive programs
In addition to typical University Interscholastic League competitive sports and academic programs common to schools of its size in Texas, the Gunter High School has participated in the BEST Robotics program since 1993.  It won state titles in 1995, 1998, and 1999.

The school has also won state titles in baseball in 1994 (Class A) and 1998 (Class AA) and in football in 2016 and 2019 (Class AAA Division II)
State Runner up in Football 2017 and 2021 (Class AAA Division II)

Students

Academics

Students in Gunter typically outperform local region and statewide averages on standardized tests.  In 2015-2016 State of Texas Assessments of Academic Readiness (STAAR) results, 90% of students in Gunter ISD met Level II Satisfactory standards, compared with 76% in Region 10 and 75% in the state of Texas. The average SAT score of the class of 2015 was 1524, and the average ACT score was 22.3.

Demographics
In the 2015-2016 school year, the school district had a total of 822 students, ranging from early childhood education and pre-kindergarten through grade 12. The class of 2015 included 73 graduates; the annual drop-out rate across grades 9-12 was less than 1%.

As of the 2015-2016 school year, the ethnic distribution of the school district was 72.9% White, 21.9% Hispanic, 1.1% American Indian, 0.5% African American, 0.5% Asian, 0.0% Pacific Islander, and 3.2% from two or more races. Economically disadvantaged students made up 29.9% of the student body.

References

External links
Gunter ISD

School districts in Grayson County, Texas
School districts in Collin County, Texas